The Cinematic Underground are an alternative rock group, with members from the UK and the U.S. (Colorado). Their debut album, Annasthesia, is a "concept narrative" about risk and escape which follows two main characters through two days in an unnamed city. Fronted by Nathan Johnson, the group is more of an artistic collective than a band, with revolving members of family and friends from both sides of the Atlantic. In 2004 various members contributed to the junkyard score Brick for the film of the same name. In 2009 various members contributed to the score for the film The Brothers Bloom. In the autumn of 2005, the group relocated to Boston, Massachusetts in order to mount a year-long live touring production of the Annasthesia show. The show mixes projected images from Zachary Johnson's Annasthesia graphic novella with film, samples and a live concert.

One of their tracks from Brick, "Kara's Theme (The Drama Vamp)," is used regularly in the radio program This American Life.

Members 
 Nathan Johnson: writer, director, lead vocals, rhythm guitar
 Zachary Johnson: drums, illustration
 Bethany Johnson: harmony vocals
 Marke Johnson: guitar, graphic design, stage design, architecture
 Kimberly Johnson: director of materials & business management
 China Kent: keyboards, pianos, talk box
 Seth Kent: technical management, instrument repair and creation
 Chris Mears: guitar, metallophone, samples
 Chris Pedley: bass guitar
 Kate Scott: photographer
 Chris Jacobs: manager
 Joe Lanman: web designer, visuals

External links
 

Rock music groups from Massachusetts
Alternative rock groups from Massachusetts